Methylorubrum rhodesianum is a species of alphaproteobacteria. It has been found on the International Space Station (ISS) amongst others.

References

Further reading

External links

LPSN
Type strain of Methylobacterium rhodesianum at BacDive -  the Bacterial Diversity Metadatabase

Hyphomicrobiales
Bacteria described in 1988